PM2FPB (87.6 FM), on-air name Hard Rock FM, is a radio station in Jakarta, Indonesia. Hard Rock FM, along with its network, is owned by MRA Media under license of Hard Rock itself. Started broadcasting in 1996, Hard Rock FM claims itself as first lifestyle radio in Indonesia, especially Jakarta. Despite its name this radio not only broadcast hard rock genre music but jazz, pop, alternative and popular music genre

Network 
Hard Rock FM has a network in four cities in Indonesia: 
 Jakarta (87.6-103.6 FM, PM2FPB)
 Bandung (87.6-104.1 FM, PM3FXI)
 Surabaya (89.35-90.05 FM, PM6FNV)
 Bali (87.6-103.0 FM, PM8FWA)

Jingles 
Previously, Hard Rock FM jingles used from JAM Creative productions, Now the Jingles of Hard Rock FM used from IQ Beats

Hard Rock Jingles as JAM Productions (1996-2002)

 Listen All Of Time, Hard Rock FM
 Starting to the end Of The Day Hard Rock FM
 87,6 Hard Rock FM
 87,6 Wherever You Go, This Is Good Morning Hard Rockers Show
 Information Hard Rock FM

Hard Rock Jingles as IQ Beats (2002–present)

 Party With No Limitation, Hard Rock FM
 The Best Hits Hard Rock FM
 The Beautiful Sounds Hard Rock FM
 Hard Rock FM Sounds KPop Top 41
 Let's Enjoy Your Life, Hard Rock FM
 87,6 Hard Rock Radio Bali
 87,6 Hard Rock FM
 87,6 Hard Rock FM
 89,35 Hard Rock FM
 Enjoy Your Life, Cruising On The Drive And Jive

References 

Indonesian radio networks
Radio stations in Jakarta
Hard Rock Cafe